John Malcolm (1769–1833) was a Scottish soldier, diplomat and historian.

John Malcolm may also refer to:

John Malcolm (Loyalist) (died 1788), sea captain, army officer, and British customs official
John Malcolm, 1st Baron Malcolm (1833–1902), British soldier and Conservative politician
John Malcolm (actor) (1936–2008), Scottish actor
John Malcolm (professor) (1873–1954), New Zealand physiologist and university professor
John Malcolm (footballer) (1917–2009), Scottish footballer
John Malcolm (bowls), New Zealand lawn bowler
Sir John Malcolm, 1st Baronet (1646–1729), of the Malcolm Baronets, MP for Forfar
Sir John Malcolm, 2nd Baronet (1681–1753), of the Malcolm baronets
Sir John Malcolm, 5th Baronet (1749–1816), of the Malcolm baronets
Sir John Malcolm, 7th Baronet (1828–1865), of the Malcolm baronets
John Malcolm, pseudonym of John Andrews (born 1936) crime writer and author of the Tim Simpson series

See also